The Recovery Glacier is a glacier flowing west along the southern side of the Shackleton Range in Antarctica. First seen from the air and examined from the ground by the Commonwealth Trans-Antarctic Expedition in 1957, it was so named because of the recovery of the expedition's vehicles which repeatedly broke into bridged crevasses on this glacier during the early stages of the crossing of Antarctica.  It is at least 100 km (60 mi) long and 64 km (40 mi) wide at its mouth.

Dana Floricioiu and Irena Hajnsek of the German Aerospace Centre spoke on the radar data showing the interior of the Recovery Glacier at the IEEE Geoscience and Remote Sensing Symposium in Cape Town, South Africa, in July 2009. The data comes from the German public-private satellite Terrasar-X and when combined with Radarsat-1 shows the changes in the glacier over 11 years.

The area contains four subglacial lakes, causing the ice flow rate to vary dramatically, ranging between 2 and 50 meters per year. The ice stream drains about 35 billion tons of water and ice into the ocean each year, while the entire East Antarctic ice sheet releases about 57 billion tons a year.

The Blackwall Ice Stream joins Recovery Glacier between the Argentina Range and the Whichaway Nunataks.

See also
 Ice stream
 List of glaciers in the Antarctic
 List of Antarctic ice streams
 Glaciology

References

Ice streams of Antarctica
Glaciers of Coats Land
Filchner-Ronne Ice Shelf
Subglacial lakes